Ancistrorhynchus is a genus of flowering plants from the orchid family Orchidaceae. It contains 16 species native to tropical Africa.

Species

Ancistrorhynchus akeassiae Pérez-Vera - Ivory Coast, Nigeria, Liberia
Ancistrorhynchus brevifolius Finet - Congo-Brazzaville
Ancistrorhynchus capitatus (Lindl.) Summerh. - Ivory Coast, Liberia, Nigeria, Sierra Leone, Togo, Central African Republic, Equatorial Guinea, Gabon, Cameroon, Gulf of Guinea Islands, Uganda, Zaire (Democratic Republic of the Congo, Congo-Kinshasa)
Ancistrorhynchus cephalotes (Rchb.f.) Summerh. - Ghana, Guinea, Ivory Coast, Liberia, Nigeria, Sierra Leone, Togo 
Ancistrorhynchus clandestinus (Lindl.) Schltr. - Ivory Coast, Ghana, Rwanda, Liberia, Nigeria, Sierra Leone, Togo, Central African Republic, Gabon, Cameroon, Uganda, Zaire (Democratic Republic of the Congo, Congo-Kinshasa)
Ancistrorhynchus crystalensis P.J.Cribb & Laan - Equatorial Guinea, Gabon, Cameroon, Gulf of Guinea Islands
Ancistrorhynchus laxiflorus Mansf. - Tanzania
Ancistrorhynchus metteniae (Kraenzl.) Summerh. - Ivory Coast, Nigeria, Sierra Leone, Central African Republic, Gabon, Cameroon, Uganda, Zaire (Democratic Republic of the Congo, Congo-Kinshasa), Tanzania, Ethiopia, Gulf of Guinea Islands, 
Ancistrorhynchus ovatus Summerh. - Central African Republic, Gabon, Cameroon, Uganda, Congo-Brazzaville, Zaire (Democratic Republic of the Congo, Congo-Kinshasa)
Ancistrorhynchus parviflorus Summerh. - Tanzania
Ancistrorhynchus paysanii Senghas - Kenya
Ancistrorhynchus recurvus Finet - Ghana, Guinea, Ivory Coast, Liberia, Nigeria, Togo, Cameroon, Uganda, Congo-Brazzaville, Zaire (Democratic Republic of the Congo, Congo-Kinshasa), Gulf of Guinea Islands
Ancistrorhynchus schumannii (Kraenzl.) Summerh. - Nigeria, Cameroon, Gabon, Zaire (Democratic Republic of the Congo, Congo-Kinshasa)
Ancistrorhynchus serratus Summerh - Bioko, Nigeria, Cameroon, Congo-Brazzaville
Ancistrorhynchus straussii (Schltr.) Schltr. - Nigeria, Cameroon, Gabon, Zaire (Democratic Republic of the Congo, Congo-Kinshasa)
Ancistrorhynchus tenuicaulis Summerh. - Cameroon, Gabon, Zaire (Democratic Republic of the Congo, Congo-Kinshasa), Equatorial Guinea, Uganda, Tanzania, Rwanda, Malawi

See also 
 List of Orchidaceae genera

References 

 Pridgeon, A.M., Cribb, P.J., Chase, M.A. & Rasmussen, F. eds. (1999). Genera Orchidacearum 1. Oxford Univ. Press.
 Pridgeon, A.M., Cribb, P.J., Chase, M.A. & Rasmussen, F. eds. (2001). Genera Orchidacearum 2. Oxford Univ. Press.
 Pridgeon, A.M., Cribb, P.J., Chase, M.A. & Rasmussen, F. eds. (2003). Genera Orchidacearum 3. Oxford Univ. Press
 Berg Pana, H. 2005. Handbuch der Orchideen-Namen. Dictionary of Orchid Names. Dizionario dei nomi delle orchidee. Ulmer, Stuttgart

Angraecinae
Orchids of Africa
Vandeae genera